This is a list of Members of Parliament elected to the Parliament of the United Kingdom at the 1951 general election, held on 25 October 1951. A total of 625 MPs were elected.

Notable newcomers to the House of Commons included Anthony Barber, Lord Lambton and Ted Short.

Composition
These representative diagrams show the composition of the parties in the 1951 general election.

Note: This is not the official seating plan of the House of Commons, which has five rows of benches on each side, with the government party to the right of the Speaker and opposition parties to the left, but with room for only around two-thirds of MPs to sit at any one time.

 The National Liberals were in alliance with the Conservatives, bringing total Conservative strength to 321 seats.

This is a complete list of Members of Parliament elected to the Parliament of the United Kingdom at the 1951 general election on 25 October 1951.

° Frank Collindridge, the sitting MP for Barnsley, died during the campaign. A special election took place on 8 November .

By-elections 
See the list of United Kingdom by-elections.

See also
List of parliaments of the United Kingdom
UK general election, 1951
:Category:UK MPs 1951-1955

References

1951
1951 United Kingdom general election
 List
UK MPs